Raymond Toole (born 30 October 1997) is a New Zealand cricketer. He made his first-class debut on 30 October 2019, for Central Districts in the 2019–20 Plunket Shield season. He made his List A debut on 17 November 2019, for Central Districts in the 2019–20 Ford Trophy.

References

External links
 

1997 births
Living people
New Zealand cricketers
Central Districts cricketers
Place of birth missing (living people)
Essex cricketers